Congregation Ahavath Chesed is a Reform Jewish synagogue in Jacksonville, Florida. It is the oldest Jewish congregation in Florida and one of the first formally incorporated.

History
Although Jews were already living in Florida in the late 18th century, Jacksonville probably was the first Jewish community organized in Florida.  The Jacksonville Hebrew Cemetery was established in 1857.  It is the oldest Jewish communal institution in Florida of which a record has been found.

In 1867 the “Israelites of Jacksonville” formed a congregation. The congregation was primarily composed of Jews from Prussia and Germany. For a number of years an organization called the Hebrew Benevolent Society also existed.  Congregation Ahavath Chesed was organized in 1880. This congregation, led by Jacksonville's Jewish Mayor, Morris A. Dzialynski, received a legal charter in 1882. The congregation hired Rabbi Marx Moses, and dedicated, on September 8, 1882, a synagogue building.

See also
List of the oldest synagogues in the United States

References

External links

1880 establishments in Florida
Buildings and structures in Jacksonville, Florida
German-American culture in Florida
German-Jewish culture in the United States
Reform synagogues in Florida
Religious organizations established in 1880
Synagogues completed in 1979